PEN USA may refer to:

 PEN America, founded in 1922 and headquartered in New York City
 PEN Center USA, a former branch of PEN